Mount Olive Cemetery is located at 3800 North Narragansett Avenue, in Chicago.

Mount Olive Cemetery was established in 1889. The cemetery was founded for Chicago's Scandinavian population.

Notable burials
 Sybil Bauer (1903–1927), Olympic Gold Medal swimmer
 Harry Juul (1893–1942), MLB player
 Niels Juul (1859–1929), US Representative

References

External links
 Official website
 
 

1889 establishments in Illinois
Cemeteries in Chicago